Lettice Fairfax (March 26, 1876 – December 25, 1948) was an English stage and silent film actress. She is known for her roles in the Edwardian musical comedy An Artist's Model (1895) and in silent cinema such as Brother Officers as Baroness Honour Royden (1915).

Plays 

Auld lang sine (1892)
Don Juan (1893)
An Artist's Model (1895)
Josiah's Dream; or, The Woman of the Future (1895)
The First Violin as May Wedderhorn (1898)
Captain Swift (1899 and 1906)
The First Night (1899)
Facing the music (1900)
Rip Van Winkle (1900)
The Price of Peace (1900)
The Queen's Double (1901)
Beau Austin (1901)
Beaucaire (1901-1902)
Sporting Simpson (1902)
Milky White (1902)
Lyre and Lancet (1902)
Brown at Brighton (1902)
Mrs. Gorringe's Necklace (1903-1904)
My Lady of Roselade (1904)
The Money Makers (1904)
A Wife without a Smile (1904)
Mollentrave on Women (1905)
Alice Sit-by-the-Fire: A Page from a Daughter's Diary (1905)
Oliver Twist! (1905)
Beside the Bonnie Brier Bush (1905)
As You Like It (1906)
Raffles, The Amateur Cracksman (1906)
The Education of Elizabeth (1907)
The Walk (1908)
A Lady calls on Peter (1921)
Me and My Diary (1922)
The Green Cord (1922)
The Rakshashi (1925)

Filmography 
Brother Officers as Baroness Honour Royden (1915)
The Glorious Adventure as Court Lady (uncredited) (1922)

References

External links

1876 births
1948 deaths
English stage actresses
English silent film actresses
19th-century English actresses
20th-century English actresses